The Miss Alabama competition is the pageant that selects the representative for the state of Alabama in the annual Miss America Competition. 

Alabama has won three Miss America titles: Deidre Downs in 2005, Heather Whitestone (the first deaf woman to win the Miss America crown) in 1995, and Yolande Betbeze in 1951. Betbeze is also known as the contestant who refused to pose in a swimsuit, causing swimsuit sponsor Catalina Swimwear to pull out and ultimately start the Miss USA pageant.

Lindsay Fincher of Wedowee was crowned Miss Alabama 2022 on July 3, 2022 at the Alabama Theatre in Birmingham, Alabama. She competed for the title of Miss America 2023 at the Mohegan Sun in Uncasville, Connecticut in December 2022 where she was a Jean Bartel Social Impact Initiaive Finalist.

Gallery of past titleholders

Results summary
The following is a visual summary of the past results of Miss Alabama titleholders at the national Miss America pageants/competitions. The year in parentheses indicates the year of the national competition during which a placement and/or award was garnered, not the year attached to the contestant's state title.

Placements
 Miss Americas: Yolande Betbeze (1951), Heather Whitestone (1995), Deidre Downs (2005)
 1st runners-up: Teresa Cheatham (1979), Paige Phillips (1981), Scarlotte Deupree (2003), Lauren Bradford (2022)
 2nd runners-up: Frances Dorn (1945), Martha Ann Ingram (1948), Anne Stuart Ariail (1957), Pam Battles (1984), Alexa Jones (2006)
 3rd runners-up: Peggy Elder (1947), Gwen Harmon (1953), Virginia McDavid (1954), Yolanda Fernandez (1983), Alison McCreary (1997)
 4th runners-up: Gloria Levinge (1936), Betty Jane Rase (1944), Angela Tower (1986), Jenny Jackson (1989), Melinda Toole (2007), Meg McGuffin (2016)
 Top 7: Jessica Procter (2018), Tiara Pennington (2020)
 Top 10: Marie Duncan (1942), Jeanne Moody (1952), Marilyn Tate (1955), Patricia Huddleston (1956), Lee Thornberry (1959), Teresa Rinaldi (1961), Delores Hodgens (1962), Judy Short (1964), Vickie Powers (1965), Linda Folsom (1966), Angie Grooms (1967), Dellynne Catching (1969), Angela Callahan (1987), Kalyn Chapman (1994), Leigh Sherer (1996), Julie Smith (2000), Jana Sanderson (2001), Caitlin Brunell (2015), Callie Walker (2019)
 Top 12: Anna Laura Bryan (2013)
 Top 13: Courtney Porter (2012)
 Top 15: Tommy Marie Peck (1936), Mildred Oxford (1938), Florine Holt (1939), Virginia McGraw (1941), Catherine Crosby (2004), Amanda Tapley (2009)

Awards

Preliminary awards
 Preliminary Lifestyle and Fitness: Marie Duncan (1942), Betty Jane Rase (1944), Peggy Elder (1947), Yolande Betbeze (1951), Gwen Harmon (1953), Judy Short (1964), Dellynne Catching (1969), Teresa Cheatham (1979), Angela Tower (1986), Heather Whitestone (1995), Ashley Davis (2011)
 Preliminary Talent: Gloria Levinge (1936), Virginia McGraw (1941), Betty Jane Rase (1944), Frances Dorn (1945), Emma Dale Nunnally (1946), Jeanne Moody (1952), Patricia Huddleston (1956), Anne Stuart Ariail (1957), Lee Thornberry (1959), Teresa Rinaldi (1961), Judy Short (1964), Vickie Powers (1965), Linda Folsom (1966), Suzanne Dennie (1971), Teresa Cheatham (1979), Paige Phillips (1981), Heather Whitestone (1995)

Non-finalist awards
 Non-finalist Talent: Anna Stange (1958), Betty Lindstrom (1960), Patricia Bonner (1963), Kathy Pickett (1980), Tammy Little (1985), Chandler Champion (2014)
 Non-finalist Interview: Resha Riggins (1991)

Other awards
 Miss Congeniality: Toula Hagestratou (1943), Melinda Toole (2007)
 Children's Miracle Network (CMN) Miracle Maker Award: Hayley Barber (2017)
 CMN Miracle Maker Award 2nd runners-up: Jamie Langley (2008), Callie Walker (2019)
Jean Bartel Social Impact Initiative Winner: Lauren Bradford (2022)
Jean Bartel Social Impact Initiative Finalists: Lindsay Fincher (2023)
 Quality of Life Award Winners: Kim Wimmer (1993), Alison McCreary (1997), Catherine Crosby (2004), Deidre Downs (2005), Anna Laura Bryan (2013), Caitlin Brunell (2015), Hayley Barber (2017), Jessica Procter (2018)
 Quality of Life Award 1st runners-up: Heather Whitestone (1995), Scarlotte Deupree (2000) Scarlotte Deupree (2003)
 Quality of Life Award 2nd runners-up: Julie Smith (2000), Alexa Jones (2006), Melinda Toole (2007), Amanda Tapley (2009), Meg McGuffin (2016)
 Quality of Life Award Finalists: Resha Riggins (1991), Leigh Sherer (1996), Jamie Langley (2008), Liz Cochran (2010)
 STEM Scholarship Award Winners: Hayley Barber (2017);  Lauren Bradford (2022)
Top Fundraiser 1st runner-ups: Lauren Bradford (2022)
 Women in Business Scholarship Award Finalists: Lauren Bradford (2022)

Winners

Notes

References

External links
 Miss Alabama official website

Alabama culture
Alabama
Women in Alabama
1935 establishments in Alabama
Recurring events established in 1935
Annual events in Alabama